Brad Willis may refer to:

 Brad Willis (Neighbours), a character on the Australian soap opera Neighbours
 Brad Willis (journalist) (born 1949), former NBC News foreign correspondent